Monika Kristina Fagerholm (born 26 February 1961 in Helsinki) is a Swedish-speaking Finnish author living in Ekenäs, Finland. She is the daughter of professor Nils-Erik Fagerholm and library amanuensis Kristina Herrgård. Fagerholm has studied psychology and literature at the University of Helsinki. In 1987, she received her bachelor's degree in psychology and literature. Fagerholm made her debut in 1987 with Sham but her real breakthrough in the literary scene was in 1994 with Underbara kvinnor vid vatten. The book was nominated for the Finlandia Prize, which is the biggest literary prize in Finland. It was also nominated for the August Prize in 1995, in Sweden and also the International Dublin Literary Award in 1998. In 1994, she received the Runeberg Award in Finland. The movie adaptation of the novel by Claes Olsson premiered in 1998. Fagerholm received the August prize in 2005 for Den amerikanska flickan (The American Girl).

Bibliography
Sham (short stories) 1987
Patricia (short stories) 1990
Underbara kvinnor vid vatten 1994
Diva 1998
Den amerikanska flickan 2005
Glitterscenen 2009
 Lola uppochner 2012
 Vem dödade bambi? 2019

Prizes and awards 
 Runeberg Award (1995), in Finland for Underbara kvinnor vid vatten
 Thanks for the Book Award (Tack för boken-medaljen) (1995) for Underbara kvinnor vid vatten
 August Prize (2005) for Den amerikanska flickan
 Aniara prize (2005)
 Göteborgs-Postens literary award (2005)
 The Swedish Literature Society Award (2005)
 Swedish Academy Nordic Prize (2016)

In addition, Den amerikanska flickan was shortlisted for the Nordic Council Literature Prize 2004 and the Runeberg Award 2004.

References

External links
 Monika Fagerholm
The Salomonsson Agency

1961 births
Living people
Writers from Helsinki
Finnish writers in Swedish
August Prize winners
University of Helsinki alumni
Swedish-speaking Finns